Yakovlevina albostriata is a moth in the family Cossidae. It was described by Yakovlev in 2006. It is found in China (Yunnan).

The length of the forewings is 17–19 mm for males and about 20 mm for females. The forewings are light-grey with a white stripe along the costal margin and a wide white area in the central part of the wing. The hindwings are a 'coffee with milk' colour.

References

Natural History Museum Lepidoptera generic names catalog

External links

Zeuzerinae
Endemic fauna of Yunnan
Moths described in 2006